Idhaya College of Arts and Science for women, Puducherry. is affiliated with Pondicherry University. It was started by the Franciscan Sisters of the Immaculate Congregation and had its inception in the year 2004.

It was formed solely for women and caters to the needs of the rural, backward, and marginalized womenfolk. It is indeed another milestone in the history of the Immaculate congregation.

The motto of the college is "Arise and Shine" which aims in moulding the youth to become strong and vibrant and to be the agent of change for better living.

The college strives to impart value-based education for the integral personality and to the development of the students.

This college offers different courses in arts, commerce and science.

Departments

Science
B.Sc Mathematics
B.Sc Physics
B. Com Corporate Secretaryship
B.Sc Biochemistry
B.Sc Computer Science
B.C.A
B.Com Commerce
B.A. English
M.A English
M.COM Commerce
M.Sc Mathematics

Accreditation
The college is recognized by the University Grants Commission (UGC).

References

External links

Universities and colleges in Puducherry
Educational institutions established in 2004
2004 establishments in Pondicherry
Colleges affiliated to Pondicherry University